Miss Firecracker is a 1989 American comedy film directed by Thomas Schlamme.  It stars Holly Hunter, Mary Steenburgen, Tim Robbins, Alfre Woodard, and Scott Glenn.  The film, set in Yazoo City, Mississippi, was written by Pulitzer Prize-winning playwright Beth Henley and is based on her 1984 play The Miss Firecracker Contest. Holly Hunter reprised the role of Carnelle Scott, whom she played in an off-Broadway production of Henley’s play.

Plot
Carnelle enters the Miss Firecracker beauty pageant which her hometown of Yazoo City, Mississippi, stages every Fourth of July, hoping to emulate her cousin Elain's win years prior. Carnelle was taken in as an orphan by her genteel cousins after the death of her mother and grows up promiscuous, brash, unfeminine and lacking in grace. Carnelle's closest friends and relatives think she is heading for a big disappointment instead of a triumph at the pageant, but Carnelle is ever hopeful.

When her male cousin, the eccentric sociopath Delmount, decides to sell the house they both live in to make money, Carnelle becomes even more determined to win, viewing it as a way to escape her small town existence. Elain returns to the town to give a speech at the pageant after a breakup with her husband. Carnelle insists Elain let her wear the red dress in which she won the contest, thinking that will guarantee her success. Elain delays giving Carnelle the dress and makes excuses as to why she cannot have it while pretending to be supportive.

Carnelle surprisingly gets on the shortlist for the pageant when one of the other contestants pulls out. Without a red dress she breaks into a locked room in the house previously occupied by a sick relative and takes an old dress to wear. She comes last at the final and is frustrated by her failure. Back at the house, she discovers Elain had brought the dress with her all along and had been lying to her. She confronts Elain about this, realizing the pageant is not the most important thing after all, then leaves the house and goes to the town observatory and watches the pageant fireworks display.

Cast

Production and release
Costing US$4 million, Miss Firecracker was the first production for Corsair Pictures, a division of United Artists Communications.  Scheduled for release in February 1989, it debuted on April 28 of that year and grossed US$1.85 million in North America. A VHS release from HBO Home Video followed in November. Miss Firecracker was released on DVD on May 25, 2004 from Millennium Entertainment.

Critical reception 
The film has a 75% rating on Rotten Tomatoes based on 12 reviews. Roger Ebert gave the film 3 and ½ stars out of four and said, "What finally makes 'Miss Firecracker' special is that it is not about who wins the contest, but about how all beauty contests are about the need to be loved and about how silly a beauty contest can seem if somebody really loves you." He lauded director Thomas Schlamme and cinematographer Arthur Albert for capturing the local atmosphere of Yazoo City with a "moony, romantic glow." Ebert praised not just the performance of Holly Hunter, but also called Tim Robbins and Alfre Woodard "the hidden treasures of the movie."

Michael Wilmington of the Los Angeles Times wrote, "When [Henley's] dialogue is working right, [she] gets the audience laughing and snorting by turns. What usually saves her is the innate theatricality of her main subject, Southern women, and of her approach.”

See also
List of American films of 1989

References

External links
 
 Miss Firecracker at AllMovie

1989 films
1989 comedy films
American comedy films
American independent films
Films about beauty pageants
American films based on plays
Films set in Mississippi
Films shot in Mississippi
Independence Day (United States) films
Films scored by David Mansfield
Films with screenplays by Beth Henley
1989 directorial debut films
1980s female buddy films
Films directed by Thomas Schlamme
1980s English-language films
1980s American films